Shirasangi is a village in Belagavi District of Karnataka, India. Shirasangi is well known for the famous Shri Kalikadevi temple and the Shirsangi Fort. Shirsangi Kalikadevi temple is considered the place where in ancient time, Shringa Maharishi worshipped the Goddess Shri Kalikadevi and requested her to bless the place, resulting in the temple.

Historical monuments
Sirsangi Vaade - a small fort belonging to Shri Tyagaveera Lingraj Desai's family
Sirsangi Kalika Temple - ancient stone temple dating back to 1st century
Siddeshwaragavi - cave temple dedicated to Shiva Linga
Bababudan Durgah - Sufi tomb and mosque
Basavana Bhavi - A small kalyani near the Kalikadevi temple.
Shri Mallikarjuna Temple - A small Shiva temple on the hill top near kalikadevi temple.

See also
 Hooli
 Saundatti
 Navilateertha
 Parasgad Fort
 Sogal
 North Karnataka
 Tourism in North Karnataka

References

Villages in Belagavi district